Ozarchaea is a genus of South Pacific shield spiders that was first described by Michael Gordon Rix in 2006.

Species
 it contains sixteen species, found only in New Zealand and Australia:
Ozarchaea bodalla Rix, 2006 – Australia (New South Wales)
Ozarchaea bondi Rix, 2006 – Australia (New South Wales)
Ozarchaea daviesae Rix, 2006 – Australia (Queensland)
Ozarchaea forsteri Rix, 2006 – New Zealand
Ozarchaea harveyi Rix, 2006 – Australia (Western Australia)
Ozarchaea janineae Rix, 2006 – Australia (New South Wales)
Ozarchaea ornata (Hickman, 1969) (type) – Australia (Tasmania)
Ozarchaea platnicki Rix, 2006 – Australia (Queensland)
Ozarchaea saxicola (Hickman, 1969) – Australia (Tasmania)
Ozarchaea spurgeon Rix, 2006 – Australia (Queensland)
Ozarchaea stradbroke Rix, 2006 – Australia (Queensland)
Ozarchaea valida Rix, 2006 – Australia (New South Wales)
Ozarchaea waldockae Rix, 2006 – Australia (Western Australia)
Ozarchaea werrikimbe Rix, 2006 – Australia (New South Wales)
Ozarchaea westraliensis Rix, 2006 – Australia (Western Australia)
Ozarchaea wiangarie Rix, 2006 – Australia (New South Wales)

See also
 List of Malkaridae species

References

Araneomorphae genera
Malkaridae
Spiders of Australia
Spiders of New Zealand